The 2022–23 Indiana Hoosiers women's basketball team represents the Indiana University Bloomington during the 2022–23 NCAA Division I women's basketball season. The Hoosiers are led by head coach Teri Moren in her ninth season, and play their home games at the Simon Skjodt Assembly Hall as a member of the Big Ten Conference.

Previous season
The Hoosiers finished the 2021–22 season with a 24–9 record, including 11–5 in Big Ten play to finish in fifth place in the conference.  They received an at-large bid to the 2022 NCAA Division I Women's Basketball Tournament, where they advanced to the Sweet Sixteen.

Roster

Schedule and results

|-
!colspan=9 style=| Exhibition

|-
!colspan=9 style=| Regular Season

|-
!colspan=6 style=|

|-
!colspan=6 style=|

Rankings

References

Indiana Hoosiers women's basketball seasons
Indiana
Indiana
Indiana
Indiana